Kritsanut Lertsattayathorn (born 16 December 1988 in Bangkok, Thailand) is a Thai snooker player. He was the Asian Snooker Champion in 2016.

Career
At the 2014 Six-red World Championship Lertsattayathorn defeated defending champion Mark Davis in the last 16 before being defeated 7–2 eventual winner Stephen Maguire in the semi-final. In 2016 Lertsattayathorn entered the Asian Snooker Championship in Doha as the 13th seed. Lertsattayathorn went on to reach the final and defeated Mohammed Shehab 8–2 to win the championship, as a result he was given a two-year card on the professional World Snooker Tour for the 2016–17 and 2017–18. At the 2016 English Open, Lertsattayathorn beat compatriot Boonyarit Keattikun 4–3 and Michael White 4–1. In the third round he was 3–2 up on Ricky Walden, but then lost the final two frames. Walden also beat Lertsattayathorn by a 4–3 scoreline in the second round of the Northern Ireland Open. He lost all five of his matches in the rest of the season.

Performance and rankings timeline

Career finals

Pro-am finals: 1 (1 title)

Amateur finals: 1 (1 title)

References

External links
Kritsanut Lertsattayathorn at CueTracker.net: Snooker Results and Statistic Database

Kritsanut Lertsattayathorn
Living people
1988 births
Kritsanut Lertsattayathorn
Kritsanut Lertsattayathorn
Southeast Asian Games medalists in cue sports
Competitors at the 2015 Southeast Asian Games
Competitors at the 2019 Southeast Asian Games
Kritsanut Lertsattayathorn
Kritsanut Lertsattayathorn
Kritsanut Lertsattayathorn